Andraca flavamaculata is a moth of the family Endromidae. It is found in China (Zhejiang, Hunan, Guangdong, Guangxi) and Vietnam.

The wingspan is 40–44 mm. Adults have a stout body. The forewing apex is falcate, the outer edge is smooth and straight and the tornus is almost rectangular.

References

Moths described in 1995
Andraca